Hallyards Castle ( "the yards at the hall"), located to the north-west of the village of Auchtertool, is reputed to have been a hunting seat of Malcolm Canmore. With the establishment of the Roman Church, Halyards became the local residence of the Bishops of Dunkeld; it remained so until the first lay proprietor took possession in 1539.

The influence that Halyards had on the district cannot be overstated. When Sir James Kirkcaldy was proprietor the castle witnessed dramatic events; according to John Knox it was visited by James V just before his death, and the murder of Cardinal Beaton was possibly discussed within its walls. During the Reformation Crisis there was fighting between French troops and the Scottish Lords of the Congregation at Halyards. William Kirkcaldy fought for the reformers.

According to Knox, after French troops blew up the house, Mary of Guise declared, "Where is now John Knox's God? My God is now stronger than his, yea, even in Fife". In February 1560 it was reported the castle was 'clean overthrown'. Kirkcaldy took his revenge on a Savoyard captain called Sebastian and his 50 French troops.

After the baptism of Prince James at Stirling Castle in December 1566, James Stewart, 1st Earl of Moray took the English ambassador the Earl of Bedford on a tour of Fife. They visited Hallyards.

In later years Halyards passed to John Boswell of Balmuto, William Forbes of Craigievar, members of the Skene family then the Earls of Moray. The castle’s name was changed to Camilla, popularly held to be in honour of a countess who bore that name, though no so-named Countess of Moray is recorded. Camilla is the name more commonly known in Auchtertool today.

With the Earls of Moray living at a distance, Halyards eventually fell into disuse. In 1819 the castle was revisited by a member of the Skene family, who found it in a dilapidated state. The great house was largely demolished in 1847. The remains can be found on farmland to the north-west of the village.

Another Hallyards Castle, near Kirkliston in West Lothian, was the focus of a feud which resulted in the shooting of John Graham, Lord Hallyards in February 1593.

References

External links
National Monuments Record of Scotland

Ruined castles in Fife
Country houses in Fife
Hunting lodges in Scotland
Buildings and structures demolished in 1847
Demolished buildings and structures in Scotland